Coyne Airways is an all cargo airline based in London, United Kingdom. It has a separate operation in Dubai, UAE. It operates scheduled cargo flights to Georgia, Armenia, Azerbaijan,  Kazakhstan, Afghanistan, Iraq, UAE, using Antonov, Boeing and Ilyushin aircraft as required. Its main bases are London Stansted, Cologne/Bonn Airport and Dubai International Airport.
It is listed as the 95th largest carrier in terms of freight ton kilometres by Airline Business magazine in its November 2008 issue.

History 

The airline was established and started operations in 1994.  It started as a charter broker specialising in the CIS market.  In 1997 it pioneered  scheduled freighter services to the Caspian starting with Baku but later adding Tbilisi, Yerevan, Aktau, Atyrau and Uralsk. In December 2006, it began serving this region with a B747 400F from Stansted to Cologne to its hub in Tbilisi where freight is then transferred to smaller aircraft for distribution around the region.

In July 2002, it inaugurated a freighter service between Seoul and Yuzhno-Sakhalinsk to meet the growing need for oil and gas development  on Sakhalin Island in the Russian Far East.

In 2004, it set up the first (and only scheduled freighter services according to  the Official Airline Guide) into Iraq serving Baghdad and many destinations around the country. In 2006 it set up scheduled services into Afghanistan serving Kandahar, Kabul and Bagram twice weekly.

It also serves Djibouti in the Horn of Africa and Sana'a, Yemen. In January 2008, it commenced Boeing 747 operations into Lagos, Nigeria. These were discontinued in April 2008.

It charters aircraft as required.  It is wholly owned by Coyne Aviation (of which the Coyne family owns 100%) and had 28 employees in October 2008.

Destinations 
Coyne Airways operates freight services to the following destinations (as of June 2013):
Afghanistan
Bagram – Bagram Air Base
Kabul – Kabul International Airport
Kandahar – Kandahar International Airport
Armenia
Yerevan – Zvartnots International Airport
Azerbaijan
Baku – Heydar Aliyev International Airport
Georgia
Tbilisi – Tbilisi International Airport Base
Iraq
Baghdad – Baghdad International Airport
Balad – Joint Base Balad
Erbil – Erbil International Airport
Kazakhstan
Aktau – Aktau Airport
Atyrau – Atyrau Airport
Oral – Oral Ak Zhol Airport
Turkmenistan
Ashgabat – Ashgabat Airport
Türkmenbaşy – Turkmenbashi Airport
United Arab Emirates
Dubai – Dubai International Airport Base
United Kingdom
London – Stansted Airport Base

Fleet 
Coyne Airways do not have their own aircraft, and instead charter the following:

References

External links 
 Coyne Airways

Airlines of the United Kingdom
Airlines established in 1994
British companies established in 1994